Bloxham County was a proposed Florida, United States county which was never created. Bloxham existed as a county on paper only, the voters refusing to approve its establishment. The County seat was to be Williston, Florida. There might have been a Call County but for a gubernatorial vote. Bloxham County was named for William D. Bloxham, who was the thirteenth and seventeenth state governor. Call County was named after Richard Keith Call, who was the third and fifth territorial governor. Bloxham was proposed in 1915 and consisted of land taken from Levy and Marion Counties. The county idea was abandoned in 1916 after failing to receive enough votes in a referendum.

References

External links
Bloxham County Maps (Florida Center for Instructional Technology)

History of Florida
Proposed counties of the United States
Levy County, Florida
History of Marion County, Florida